The Maritana was a ship that sank on November 3, 1861 off the coast of Massachusetts. It has been called "Boston Harbor's worst shipwreck."

A monument to the captain, G.W. Williams, and those who were lost was placed at Old Village Cemetery in Dedham, Massachusetts.

References

19th-century ships
Shipwrecks of the Massachusetts coast
Maritime incidents in November 1861